First Lieutenant Orson W. Bennett (November 17, 1841 – January 8, 1904) was an American soldier who fought in the American Civil War. Bennett received the country's highest award for bravery during combat, the Medal of Honor, for his action at Honey Hill, South Carolina on 30 November 1864. He was honored with the award on 9 March 1887.

Biography
Bennett was born in Union City in Branch County, Michigan. He enlisted into the 1st Iowa Volunteers at Dubuque, Iowa. Having left the war due to injuries he received during the Battle of Wilson's Creek, he subsequently re-enlisted into the 12th Wisconsin Infantry and was later a lieutenant in the 102d U.S. Colored Troops.

He received the medal of honor for his action on 30 November 1864, during the Battle of Honey Hill. The 3rd New York Battery having been decimated and leaving behind useful artillery, Bennett led his infantry unto the battlefield to recover the cannons. After several attempts his men were finally able to recover the artillery.

Bennett died on January 8, 1904. His remains are interred at Bala Cynwyd, Pennsylvania.

Medal of Honor citation

See also

List of American Civil War Medal of Honor recipients: A–F

References

1841 births
1904 deaths
People of Michigan in the American Civil War
Union Army officers
United States Army Medal of Honor recipients
American Civil War recipients of the Medal of Honor
People from Union City, Michigan